Myrotvorets or Mirotvorets, is a Ukrainian Kyiv-based website that publishes a running list, and sometimes personal information, of people who are considered by authors of the website to be "enemies of Ukraine", or, as the website itself states, "whose actions have signs of crimes against the national security of Ukraine, peace, human security, and the international law". The website was launched in December 2014 by Ukrainian politician and activist Georgy Tuka. The publishing personal information on the site was criticized by human rights organizations.

Overview
The site reflects the work of NGO "Myrotvorets centre", led by a person only known with the alias "Roman Zaitsev", former employee of Luhansk Security Service of Ukraine office. In 2016, the Daily Beast reported that the website was curated by the government law-enforcement and intelligence agency Security Service of Ukraine (SBU). In 2022, its founder, George Tuka, denied that the project is managed by the SBU or that it receives state funding.

It has been promoted by Anton Herashchenko, a co-founder and later advisor to the Ministry of Internal Affairs of Ukraine . The identity of the staff is secret, and a hidden panel sifts through information, often collated from Open-source intelligence, as well as information provided by individuals on a confidential basis.

Although it has no official status, the website is regularly consulted at checkpoints to integrate government information systems. According to Tuka, the site has led to the arrest of 1,000 people, since the site's launch, which he claimed included many collaborators and people working for the Federal Security Service that would otherwise not be in any government databases. 

The slogan of the centre's website and the centre itself is a Latin saying: Pro bono publico (for the public good). 

Myrotvorets Centre began to develop the project in summer 2014, during the war in Donbas after a chance meeting between Tuka and "Roman Zaitsev". The project was launched in December 2014 as part of the work of the volunteer group known as "Narodny Tyl".

On 7 May 2016, the website published the personal data of 4,508 journalists and other media members from all over the world who had worked (or had received accreditation to work) on the war in the uncontrolled government territory of Donbas, and therefore were considered by the site to have cooperated with terrorists. There were phone numbers, email addresses, and some countries and cities of residence of Ukrainian and foreign journalists received from the hacked database of Donetsk People's Republic Ministry of State Security; journalists and support staff provided these data to be accredited by the unrecognized Donetsk People's Republic. In response, the Security Service of Ukraine issued a statement that it found no violations of Ukrainian law by Myrotvorets. According to Yulia Gorbunova, senior researcher for Human Rights Watch, the implications this list has for press freedoms is serious, adding that the existence of the list puts lives in danger. The then President of Ukraine, Petro Poroshenko called the leak a "big mistake".

Activity

The "Myrotvorets" leader states that the centre's objective is to provide information and advice to the executive authorities, to finally bring peace and harmony in Ukraine. In its work the centre pays special attention to expressions of "separatist and terrorist activities" on the territory of Ukraine.

"Myrotvorets" is also recognised by the courts of Ukraine when making decisions, according to rights group Uspishna Varta. According to them the data of the collected on the website is used in court decisions at all stages - from the beginning of the pre-trial investigation to the conviction of the person, and in numerous rulings, judges also accept information from the "Myrotvorets" as material evidence. The use of the website applies not only to criminal cases, but also to civil legal relations and factfinding acts. As of 2019, data from the site was used in over 100 cases, according to Uspishna Varta.

In October 2015, Herashchenko said on Facebook that a special section titled "Putin's crimes in Syria and the Middle East" dedicated to providing personal data of Russian military personnel involved in the operation in Syria will be added to Myrotvorets. Myrotvorets' actions caused extremely strong reactions from the Russian presidential administration and among Russian experts in military affairs and special operations. As stated in the website InformNapalm, an important element of the operation was to compare the numbers of Su-24 from the Russian airbase "Shagol" and the same type of aircraft, overturned in Syria. A few days after the operation began, Russian TV started to hide the numbers of military aircraft based in Syria for their video shoots. After the information was published, the Investigative Committee of Russia launched criminal proceedings against Herashchenko for "public calls to terrorism."

In February 2016, members of the centre took part in the operation of mobile groups against illegal transport of cargo through the line of armed conflict in the war in Donbas.

Myrotvorets Centre repeatedly provided information on the participation of foreign nationals in the armed conflict, on the side of pro-Russian separatists. In early March 2016, due to the materials published by the centre, law enforcement authorities in Bulgaria initiated criminal proceedings against George Bliznakov, a Bulgarian citizen. Similar materials are being considered regarding other Bulgarian citizens.

After the site published the data of various journalists, Valeriya Lutkovska, Ukrainian lawyer and Ombudswoman of Ukraine since April 2012, demanded both the website and the Centre be shut down.

On 24 May 2016, Committee to Protect Journalists wrote an open letter to then Ukrainian President Poroshenko urging him to "condemn the unfounded and damaging allegations published on Myrotvorets, and to clarify publicly that the Ukrainian Interior Ministry is dedicated to protecting journalists and apprehending the people responsible for threatening them, in contrast to Interior Minister Avakov's previous statements".

On 2 June 2016, G7 ambassadors to Kyiv released a joint statement expressing deep concern about disclosures of journalists' personal data on the Myrotvorets website and called on the Myrotvorets team to withdraw personal data from public access. In 2017 Myrotvorets had a criminal case opened against it by the Ukrainian National Police, and the United Nations High Commissioner for Human Rights (OHCHR) urged Ukraine to investigate the website's operations.

Following the 2022 Russian invasion of Ukraine, the site started the "SeaKrime" initiative to track grain stolen from Ukraine and resold primarily through the port of Sevastopol. This initiative was able to track 200,000 tons of stolen wheat from the Russian-occupied territories over the period of March and April 2022. Based on the SeaKrime data, investigations by France Info and Le Monde were able to track some of the stolen grain to Syria after a ship was turned away from Egypt.

People included to the list 
According to the head of the centre, 4.5 thousand people were in the file cabinet in October 2014; 16 December 2015 – 7.5 thousand; January 2015 – 9000; 13 April 2015 – 30 thousand. In October 2015 – 45 thousand people; by 21 March 2016 – 57,775 people; by 27 January 2017 - more than 102 thousand, on the 23rd of August 2019 - 187 thousand. The most complete database contains residents of the Crimea.

Myrotvorets has often blacklisted people over Crimean related issues, which usually means they cannot cross into Ukraine due to the site's usage in border entry checks. Gerhard Schröder was added after he said the Crimean annexation "a reality that must one day be recognised". Roger Waters was added when he said Russia has more rights to Crimea than Ukraine. Silvio Berlusconi, Roy Jones Jr, and a number of Russian pop music stars were all added for visiting Crimea, which Ukraine calls an illegal border crossing.

In April 2015, Myrotvorets published the home addresses of Ukrainian writer Oles Buzina and former Verkhovna Rada parliamentarian Oleg Kalashnikov, just days before they were assassinated.

On 12 September 2017 Myrotvorets added Yulia Tymoshenko (former Prime Minister of Ukraine and leader of the opposition party Batkivshchyna) to its database for “the illegal crossing of Ukraine’s state border. An assault within a group of persons on border guards fulfilling their duties to protect the state border of Ukraine. Participation in preparations for the illegal crossing of Ukraine’s border by a person without Ukrainian citizenship. Manipulation of socially important information”. On 15 April 2018, Syrian President Bashar al-Assad's name was added to the website.

In September 2018, Myrotvorets wrote on Facebook that their database included residents of Zakarpattia Oblast who had illegally taken out Hungarian citizenship. After two weeks of work in Zakarpattia Oblast, the database held more than 300 names of Ukrainian officials and local councillors from the oblast who had Hungarian passports. On 11 October 2018, Hungarian Foreign Minister Péter Szijjártó said: "It is a lie that the Ukrainian state has nothing to do with the website that is listing suspected dual Ukrainian-Hungarian nationals", and claimed that President Petro Poroshenko "gave his consent to the hate campaign in an attempt to increase his popularity".

In November 2018 Myrotvorets added Gerhard Schröder, the former chancellor of Germany and chairman of the supervisory board of Russian company Rosneft, to its list because authors accused him of "anti-Ukrainian propaganda" and attempting to justify "Russian aggression against Ukraine." A spokeswoman of the German Federal Foreign Office protested against this and asked the Ukrainian government to delete the website.

The website published a list of Russian workers involved in the construction of the Kerch bridge. The bridge is a Russian project to connect the Crimean Peninsula to Russia.

Following the beginning of the 2022 Russian invasion of Ukraine, Myrotvorets added the names of Viktor Orbán (Prime Minister of Hungary) and Zoran Milanović (President of Croatia) in its list of "Enemies of Ukraine". Both had expressed pro-Russian views following the start of the invasion. On 27 May 2022, Myrotvorets added the former US State Secretary Henry Kissinger after Kissinger, speaking at the World Economic Forum in Davos, suggested that fully antagonizing Russia threatens stability in Europe. The site accused Kissinger of spreading "Russian-fascist propaganda" and acting as an "accomplice to the crimes of Russian authorities against Ukraine and its citizens." In 2022, the site also added Oleksii Arestovych, an Adviser to the Head of the Office of the President of Ukraine to its list.

See also 
 Proscription
 Enemy of the people
 Redwatch
 Doxing

References

External links 
 Myrotvorets

Ukrainian websites
Internet properties established in 2014
2014 establishments in Ukraine
War in Donbas
Internet vigilantism
Internet-based activism
Annexation of Crimea by the Russian Federation
Human rights abuses in Ukraine
Russian–Ukrainian cyberwarfare
Non-profit organizations based in Ukraine